The Mitsubishi B2M was a Japanese carrier-based torpedo bomber of the 1920s and 1930s. It was built by Mitsubishi to a design by Blackburn Aircraft of Britain and was operated by the Imperial Japanese Navy.

Design and development
In 1927, the Japanese company Mitsubishi commissioned the British aircraft manufacturer Blackburn Aircraft to design an aircraft, which would be built under licence by Mitsubishi if successful, to enter a competition held by the Imperial Japanese Navy for a carrier-based reconnaissance and torpedo bomber to replace its B1M. Blackburn developed a design, the Blackburn T.7B, which was an enlarged development of their Ripon, which was under development for Britain's Fleet Air Arm. The T.7B was a three-seat biplane of steel tube construction and with high aspect ratio wings fitted with Handley Page slats, powered by a 466 kW (625 hp) Hispano-Suiza 12Lbr engine.

The design was declared the winner of the competition, with a prototype (referred to as the 3MT4) being ordered from Blackburn. This first flew on 28 December 1929 at Blackburn's factory at Brough, Yorkshire, and was shipped to Japan in February 1930.

Three development prototypes were built by Mitsubishi in Japan before the aircraft was adopted as the Navy Type 89-1 Model 1 Carrier Attack Plane or Mitsubishi B2M1.

Operational history
Modifications to improve maintainability resulted in the B2M2 or Navy Type 89-2 Carrier Attack Plane, which otherwise showed little improvement in performance over the B2M1. Production of both versions totalled 204 aircraft.

B2Ms were extensively used for high- and low-level bombing attacks against China at the start of the Second Sino-Japanese War in 1937.

Variants

Blackburn T.7B
Prototype aircraft built by Blackburn Aircraft.
Mitsubishi 3MT4
Three Japanese-built prototypes.
Mitsubishi B2M1
Initial production aircraft.
Mitsubishi B2M2
Improved production variant with reduced wingspan and modified tail.

Operators

Imperial Japanese Navy

Specifications (B2M1)

See also

References

External links

Wings Palette - Profiles of B2M 

B2M
1930s Japanese bomber aircraft
Single-engined tractor aircraft
Biplanes
Carrier-based aircraft
Blackburn aircraft
1920s British bomber aircraft
Aircraft first flown in 1929